Nyack Public Schools is a school district headquartered in the Town of Orangetown, New York, United States. It serves several areas in Orangetown and Clarkstown including the villages of Nyack, South Nyack, and Upper Nyack, Upper Grand View, and the hamlet of Valley Cottage. As of December 2004 the district had 2,881 students in all five schools.

History
A February 1999 report released by a chapter of the National Association for the Advancement of Colored People and the Nyack Partners in Education stated that honors classes had nine times as many Euro-Americans as African Americans, while the district that Nyack is a part of had two Euro-Americans for one African Americans as a whole. This caused racial tension in the district.

In 2001, Upper Nyack Elementary School, one of the three primary schools in the district, was the subject of "Kindergarten" an HBO documentary that explored the lives of 23 kindergarten students at the school in the 2001–2002 school year. The 13 part series was produced by Emmy winning producers Karen Goodman and Kirk Simon. Goodman said at the time she chose Upper Nyack Elementary School because she, "wanted a school that really could feel like it was anywhere."

Schools

Secondary schools
 Nyack High School (Upper Nyack)
 Nyack Middle School (South Nyack)

Primary schools
 Liberty Elementary School (previously known as Lake Road School) (Valley Cottage)
 Upper Nyack School (Upper Nyack)
 Valley Cottage School (Valley Cottage)

References

External links
 

School districts in New York (state)
Education in Rockland County, New York
Educational institutions in the United States with year of establishment missing